The 1993 Cork Intermediate Football Championship was the 58th staging of the Cork Intermediate Football Championship since its establishment by the Cork County Board in 1909. The draw for the opening round fixtures took place on 13 December 1992. 

The final was played on 26 September 1993 at Sam Maguire Park in Dunmanway, between Bantry Blues and Ballincollig, in what was their first ever meeting in a final. Bantry Blues won the match by 0-12 o 0-10 to claim their sixth championship title overall and a first title in 18 years.

Bantry's Kevin Harrington was the championship's top scorer with 4-30.

Results

First round

Second round

Quarter-finals

Semi-finals

Final

Championship statistics

Top scorers

Top scorers overall

In a single game

References

Cork Intermediate Football Championship